Habibi Ana is the fourth studio album from the Lebanese singer Haifa Wehbe released in 2008. The album contains 15 tracks. Haifa worked with various famous songwriters, composers, and arrangers on this album. The album contains the already three released singles, "Mosh Adra Astna", "Mat'olesh Lehad", and "Hasa Ma Bena". In the Middle East album sales struggled due to Haifa's lack of promotion as she was concentrating more on her acting and film career at the time.

Track listing

References

External links 

2008 albums
Alam elPhan Records albums
Haifa Wehbe albums
Arabic-language albums